George Dymond (c.1797 – 29 August 1835) was a British architect working mainly in Bristol.

List of works

 Magistrates’ Court, Old Council House, Corn Street (1829), with Richard Shackleton Pope
 Higher Market, Exeter (1835), completed by Charles Fowler

References
 H.M. Colvin, A Biographical Dictionary of British Architects, 1600-1840 (1997) 
 Walter Ison, The Georgian Buildings of Bristol, Kingsmead Press (1978) 
 George Dymond: obituary, The Architectural Magazine, III (1836) p. 48

1797 births
1835 deaths
19th-century English architects
Architects from Bristol